Ivan Karadzhov (born 12 July 1989) is a Bulgarian footballer, who plays as a goalkeeper for Bulgarian First League club Beroe.

Career
He made his official debut for CSKA in the last match of 2008-09 season in the Bulgarian A PFG (Professional Football Group) against Lokomotiv Mezdra. On 18 November he terminated his contract with CSKA Sofia due to unpaid salaries. He won the Bulgarian Cup as a member of Beroe. In February 2017, Karadzhov joined Belarusian Premier League side Shakhtyor Soligorsk. He appeared in 15 matches for the team before signing with Arda Kardzhali as a free agent in March 2018.

International career
Karadzhov was part of the Bulgaria national under-19 football team, who plays on 2008 UEFA European Under-19 Football Championship in Czech Republic. After his good displays, on 2 October 2009 he was called by the head coach of the Bulgarian national football team Stanimir Stoilov for the matches against Cyprus and Georgia. He did not receive any national team call-ups again until November 2020, and he finally made his debut for the senior team on 5 June 2021 in a friendly against Russia.

Personal life
Karadzhov and his spouse Slavina have two children - a girl and a boy.

Honours

Club
CSKA Sofia
 Bulgarian Supercup:  2008; 2011
 Bulgarian Cup: 2010–11

Beroe
 Bulgarian Cup: 2012–13
 Bulgarian Supercup:  2013

References

External links

1989 births
Living people
Bulgarian footballers
Bulgaria youth international footballers
Bulgaria under-21 international footballers
Bulgaria international footballers
Bulgarian expatriate footballers
Expatriate footballers in Belarus
First Professional Football League (Bulgaria) players
Belarusian Premier League players
Association football goalkeepers
PFC CSKA Sofia players
PFC Rilski Sportist Samokov players
PFC Lokomotiv Plovdiv players
PFC Slavia Sofia players
PFC Beroe Stara Zagora players
FC Vereya players
FC Shakhtyor Soligorsk players
FC Arda Kardzhali players
FC CSKA 1948 Sofia players
People from Kresna
Sportspeople from Blagoevgrad Province
21st-century Bulgarian people